Luis Alberto Nogueira (born April 10, 1985) is a Brazilian professional mixed martial artist who competes in the bantamweight division. A professional MMA competitor since 2008, Nogueira has mostly fought for Shooto Brazil before making his U.S. debut with Bellator Fighting Championships.

Mixed martial arts career

Background
Nogueira won his first four fights before losing his first fight by way of second round submission to future Bellator Bantamweight Champion Eduardo Dantas. Since then he has won 10 out of his last 12 fights including wins over Alexis Vila, Hiroshi Nakamura and Rodolfo Marques.

Bellator Fighting Championships
In April 2011, Nogueira signed with the #2 MMA promotion Bellator. He made his debut against Jerod Spoon winning a unanimous decision.

With the win he entered the Season 5 Bantamweight tournament but lost a unanimous decision to Ed West in the quarter-finals.

His next fight would be against Zak Laird, who he submitted in under a minute in the first round. It was then announced that Nogueira would compete in the Season 6 Bantamweight tournament.

Unlike his previous quarter final, Nogueira notched up the biggest victory of his career thus far, winning a unanimous decision over Olympic Bronze Medalist Alexis Vila. Nogueira next competed against Hiroshi Nakamura in the tournament semi-finals. He won the fight via KO in the third round.

He faced Marcos Galvao in the finals of the tournament and lost via second round TKO.

In his next bout for the organization, he faced Frank Baca at Bellator 105 on October 25, 2013. He won via arm triangle choke in the second round.

Pancrase
In March 2015, Nogueira signed a multi-fight deal with Pancrase.

Personal life
Nogueira had a very short childhood, being married at the age of 14 and having his first child when he was 15 years old.

Championships and accomplishments
Bellator Fighting Championships
Bellator Season 6 Bantamweight Tournament Runner-Up

Mixed martial arts record

|-
|Loss
|align=center|23–10–2
|Marcos Rodrigues
|KO (knees)
|SFT 32: Nogueira vs. Marajó
|
|align=center|1
|align=center|4:14
|São Paulo, Brazil
| 
|-
|Win
|align=center|23–8–2
|Heliton dos Santos
|Submission (anaconda choke)
|SFT 29: Nogueira vs Santos
|
|align=center| 2
|align=center| 3:30
|São Paulo, Brazil
| 
|-
|Loss
|align=center|22–9–2
|Rudney Carvalho
|TKO (retirement)
|Rei da Luta 3
|
|align=center|1
|align=center|4:47
|Rio de Janeiro, Brazil
|
|-
|Win
|align=center|22–8–2
|Rafael Barbosa
|Decision (split)
|Future FC 9
|
|align=center|3
|align=center|5:00
|São Paulo, Brazil
|
|-
|Draw
|align=center|21–8–2
|Fabricio Oliveira
|Draw (majority)
|Qualify Combat 7
|
|align=center|3
|align=center|5:00
|Salvador, Brazil
| 
|-
|Loss
|align=center|21–8–1
|Islam Siszbulatow
|KO (punch)
|ACB 84: Agujev vs. Burrell
|
|align=center|1
|align=center|1:39
|Bratislava, Slovakia
| 
|-
|Loss
|align=center|21–7–1
|Said Nurmagomedov
|Decision (unanimous)
|World Fighting Championship Akhmat 42
|
|align=center| 3
|align=center| 5:00
|Moscow, Russia
| 
|-
|Loss
|align=center|21–6–1
|Yunus Evloev
|Decision (unanimous)
|World Fighting Championship Akhmat 38
|
|align=center|3
|align=center|5:00
|Grozny, Russia
|
|-
|Loss
|align=center|21–5–1
|Mamoru Yamaguchi
|Decision (split)
|Pancrase: 281
|
|align=center|3
|align=center|5:00
|Tokyo, Japan
|
|-
|Win
|align=center|21–4–1
|Johnny Frachey
|Submission (arm-triangle choke)
|World Fighting Championship Akhmat 16 
|
|align=center|2
|align=center|3:57
|Grozny, Russia
|
|-
|Win
|align=center|20–4–1
|Yuki Baba
|KO (slam)
|Pancrase: 271
|
|align=center|1
|align=center|1:12
|Tokyo, Japan
|
|-
|Loss
|align=center|19–4–1
|Masakatsu Ueda
|Decision (unanimous)
|Pancrase: 268
|
|align=center|3
|align=center|5:00
|Tokyo, Japan
|
|-
|Win
|align=center|19–3–1
|Hemerson Hubaldo
|Decision (unanimous)
|Face to Face 11
|
|align=center|3
|align=center|5:00
|Rio de Janeiro, Brazil
|
|-
|Win
|align=center|18–3–1
|Paulo Robinson
|Decision (unanimous)
|Face to Face 8
|
|align=center|3
|align=center|5:00
|Rio de Janeiro, Brazil
|
|-
|Win
|align=center|17–3–1
|Francisco Cylderlan Lima da Silva
|Decision (unanimous)
|Face to Face 6
|
|align=center|3
|align=center|5:00
|Rio de Janeiro, Brazil
|
|-
|Win
|align=center|16–3–1
|Frank Baca
|Submission (arm triangle choke)
|Bellator 105
|
|align=center|1
|align=center|4:41
|Rio Rancho, New Mexico, United States
|
|-
|Draw
|align=center|15–3–1
|Francisco de Lima Maciel
|Draw
|Watch Out Combat Show 27
|
|align=center|3
|align=center|5:00
|Rio de Janeiro, Brazil
|
|-
|Win
|align=center|15–3
|Francisco Figueiredo
|Submission (arm triangle choke)
|BOTB: Para vs. Brazil
|
|align=center|2
|align=center|N/A
|Belém, Brazil
|
|-
|Loss
|align=center|14–3
|Marcos Galvao
|TKO (elbows)
|Bellator 73
|
|align=center|2
|align=center|4:20
|Tunica, Mississippi, United States
|Bellator Season 6 Bantamweight Tournament Final
|-
|Win
|align=center|14–2
|Hiroshi Nakamura
|KO (punches)
|Bellator 70
|
|align=center|3
|align=center|1:58
|New Orleans, Louisiana, United States
|Bellator Season 6 Bantamweight Tournament Semifinal
|-
|Win
|align=center|13–2
|Alexis Vila
|Decision (unanimous)
|Bellator 65
|
|align=center|3
|align=center|5:00
|Atlantic City, New Jersey, United States
|Bellator Season 6 Bantamweight Tournament Quarterfinal
|-
|Win
|align=center|12–2
|Zak Laird
|Submission (guillotine choke)
|Bellator 53
|
|align=center|1
|align=center|0:51
|Miami, Oklahoma, United States
|
|-
|Loss
|align=center|11–2
|Ed West
|Decision (unanimous)
|Bellator 51
|
|align=center|3
|align=center|5:00
|Canton, Ohio, United States
|Bellator Season 5 Bantamweight Tournament Quarterfinal
|-
|Win
|align=center|11–1
|Jerod Spoon
|Decision (unanimous)
|Bellator 42
|
|align=center|3
|align=center|5:00
|Concho, Oklahoma, United States
|
|-
|Win
|align=center|10–1
|Atila Lourenco
|Submission (arm-triangle choke)
|Shooto: Brazil 19
|
|align=center|2
|align=center|0:50
|Flamengo, Brazil
|
|-
|Win
|align=center|9–1
|Mauricio Santos Jr.
|Decision (unanimous)
|Juiz de Fora Fight: Evolution
|
|align=center|3
|align=center|5:00
|Juiz de Fora, Brazil
|
|-
|Win
|align=center|8–1
|Erivaldo Santos
|TKO (punches)
|Universal Fight Combat
|
|align=center|1
|align=center|4:19
|Anchieta, Rio de Janeiro, Brazil
|
|-
|Win
|align=center|7–1
|Albino Mendes
|Decision (split)
|X-Combat Ultra MMA
|
|align=center|3
|align=center|5:00
|Vitoria, Brazil
|
|-
|Win
|align=center|6–1
|Zeilton Rodrigues
|Decision (unanimous)
|Shooto: Brazil 13
|
|align=center|3
|align=center|5:00
|Fortaleza, Brazil
|
|-
|Win
|align=center|5–1
|Rodolfo Marques
|Decision (unanimous)
|Shooto: Brazil 11
|
|align=center|3
|align=center|5:00
|Barra da Tijuca, Brazil
|
|-
|Loss
|align=center|4–1
|Eduardo Dantas
|Submission (armbar)
|Shooto: Brazil 9
|
|align=center|2
|align=center|1:41
|Fortaleza, Brazil
| For the vacant Shooto South America Featherweight (123 - 132 lbs.) Championship
|-
|Win
|align=center|4–0
|Zanon Pitbull
|Decision (split)
|Shooto: Brazil 8
|
|align=center|3
|align=center|5:00
|Barra da Tijuca, Brazil
|
|-
|Win
|align=center|3–0
|Hudson Rocha
|TKO (punches)
|Shooto: Brazil 7
|
|align=center|1
|align=center|4:13
|Rio de Janeiro, Brazil
|
|-
|Win
|align=center|2–0
|Luis Henrique Drago
|KO (punch)
|Watch Out Combat Show 1
|
|align=center|1
|align=center|N/A
|Barra da Tijuca, Brazil
|
|-
|Win
|align=center|1–0
|Evanderson Lopes
|TKO
|Comunidade Fight 1
|
|align=center|N/A
|align=center|N/A
|Rio de Janeiro, Brazil
|

See also
 List of Bellator MMA alumni
 List of male mixed martial artists

References

External links
 

Brazilian male mixed martial artists
Bantamweight mixed martial artists
Mixed martial artists utilizing wrestling
1985 births
Living people
Sportspeople from Rio de Janeiro (city)